Takming University of Science and Technology (TMUST) is a private university in Neihu District, Taipei, Taiwan.

TMUST has six colleges: the College of Engineering, the College of Business, the College of Design, the College of Humanities and Social Sciences, the College of Tourism and Hospitality, and the College of Continuing Education. Each college offers majors and programs for students to choose from, including computer science, mechanical engineering, business administration, digital media design, international tourism and hospitality management.

History
The university was originally established in 1965. It was previously known as Takming College.

Faculties
 College of Finance
 College of Informatics
 College of Management

Library
The university library consists of more than 300,000 volumes of books, more than 1,000 journals and more than 50,000 electronic journals.

Transportation
The university is accessible within walking distance North of Xihu Station of the Taipei Metro.

Notable alumni
 Ellen Young, member of New York State Assembly (2006–2008)
 Miu Chu, singer

See also
 List of universities in Taiwan

References

External links

 

1965 establishments in Taiwan
Educational institutions established in 1965
Universities and colleges in Taipei
Universities and colleges in Taiwan
Technical universities and colleges in Taiwan